The 2016 NCAA Division I Men's Swimming and Diving Championships were held on March 23–26 at the Georgia Institute of Technology in Atlanta. This event determined the team and individual 2016 national champions of Division I men's collegiate swimming and diving in the United States, and was the 93rd annual champion swim meet sanctioned by the NCAA.

The Texas Longhorns won the team championship, coming in 190 points ahead of the California Golden Bears. This win secured the Longhorns their second consecutive title and their twelfth title overall.

Team rankings (top 10) 
Note: Not all the competitors have been displayed in the rankings below. For the full results, click here.

Individual event rankings (top 3)
Note: Only the top three competitors of each event have been listed below. Gold medalists are the competitors who finished first within their event; silver medalists, the competitors who finished second; and bronze medalists, the competitors who finished third.

Diving results

See also
List of college swimming and diving teams

References

NCAA Division I Men's Swimming and Diving Championships
NCAA Division I Swimming And Diving Championships
NCAA Division I Men's Swimming And Diving Championships
NCAA Division I Men's Swimming and Diving Championships